Amirovka is a rural locality (a village) in Bardymsky District, Perm Krai, Russia. The population was 23 as of 2010. There is 1 street.

Geography 
Amirovka is located 39 km southeast of Barda (the district's administrative centre) by road. Karmanovka is the nearest rural locality.

References 

Rural localities in Bardymsky District